The Evangelical Fellowship of Congregational Churches (EFCC) is an association of around 120 independent local churches in the United Kingdom, each practising congregationalist church governance.  The EFCC was founded in 1967 by those evangelical Congregationalists who did not want to lose their independence with the formation of the Congregational Church of England and Wales and the subsequent formation of the United Reformed Church in 1972. The EFCC is an Affinity partner.

The EFCC churches share a common doctrinal statement, called the Basis of Faith, which is Reformed and Evangelical.  As the EFCC churches are congregational, the EFCC does not have any denominational hierarchy.  However, the Fellowship does have officers, including a ministry director.

Some of their churches are also in membership of the Congregational Federation or of the Fellowship of Independent Evangelical Churches (FIEC).

The EFCC is a member of the World Evangelical Congregational Fellowship (WECF). EFCC hosted the WECF's Triennial Conference in 2007 at Hothorpe Hall, Leicestershire and again in 2019 at Hebron Hall in South Wales.

References

External links
 

Christian organizations established in 1967
Evangelicalism in the United Kingdom
Reformed denominations in the United Kingdom
Congregational denominations established in the 20th century
Calvinist denominations established in the 20th century

Congregationalism in the United Kingdom